It'z Icy (stylized as IT'z ICY) is the first Korean extended play by the South Korean girl group Itzy released on July 29, 2019, by JYP Entertainment. "Icy" was released as the lead single from the EP. The physical release is available in two versions: IT'z and ICY.

Background and release 
In May 2019, JYP Entertainment released an interview for the media that Itzy was preparing to return to the scene, officially confirming that they would return in July. At 6pm KST on July 29, the mini-album 'IT’z ICY' was officially released.

Promotion
International Global Media began promoting the EP on July 9, 2019, with the group teaser posters. On July 14, 2019, Yeji's teaser posters were revealed. Lia's teaser posters were revealed the next day. Ryujin's teaser posters were revealed on July 16. The teaser posters for Chaeryong was revealed on the next day. The teaser posters for Yuna were revealed on July 18. The first music video teaser was released on July 24. The second and the last one was released the next day.

Music video
The music video for the title track was released at midnight of the same day and accumulated 18.1 million views within 24 hours. As of February 2021, it has over 200 million views on YouTube.

On August 2, the dance practice video for "Icy" was released on Itzy's official YouTube channel.

Charts performance
On August 5, It'z Icy debuted and peaked at number 11 on the US Billboard World Albums chart and at number 19 on the Billboard Heatseekers Albums, making it their first entry on both charts.

In Japan, It'z Icy debuted at number 12 and 32 on Oricon Albums Chart and Japan Hot Albums chart. It'z Icy also entered at number 10 on Oricon Digital Albums chart.

Track listing

Charts

Accolades

Release history

References

2019 debut EPs
Itzy EPs
Korean-language EPs
JYP Entertainment EPs